David Derek Sikua (born 10 October 1958) served as the ninth Prime Minister of Solomon Islands from 20 December 2007 to 25 August 2010. He is a member of the Solomon Islands Liberal Party.

Career
Sikua is from Ngalitavethi Village in Guadalcanal Province. He was Undersecretary of the Ministry of Education and Human Resources Development from April 1993 to February 1994; Permanent Secretary of the Ministry of Education and Human Resources Development from February 1994 to November 1997; then Permanent Secretary of the Ministry of Forests, Environment and Conservation from November 1997 to January 1998.

In 2003 he graduated from the University of Waikato, New Zealand, with a PhD in Education. The university recognised him with a Distinguished Alumni Award in 2008.

Returning to the Solomon Islands he became Permanent Secretary with Special Duties at the Ministry of Education and Human Resources Development from May 2003 to 7 September 2003, then Permanent Secretary of the Ministry of Education and Human Resources Development from 8 September 2003 to 31 December 2005.

He was elected to the National Parliament in April 2006 (as MP for the North East Guadalcanal constituency) and became Minister of Education and Human Resources Development under Prime Minister Manasseh Sogavare on 4 May 2006. He joined the opposition in November 2007. After Sogavare was defeated on 13 December 2007 in a motion of no-confidence, which was put forward by Sikua, Sikua was the opposition's candidate to replace him. He was elected Prime Minister by Parliament on 20 December 2007, receiving 32 votes against 15 for government candidate Patteson Oti. He was sworn in on the same day, and his Cabinet was sworn in on 21 December and 22 December.

He lost power following the August 2010 general election. Though he retained his seat in Parliament, as the sole MP for the Liberal Party, he did not contest the premiership, and Danny Philip succeeded him. On 29 March 2011, he was elected Leader of the Opposition. On 15 December 2014, following a general election, he was appointed Minister for Education and Human Resources by new Prime Minister Manasseh Sogavare.

References

External links

Solomon Times: Landslide Victory for Prime Minister Sikua
Prime Minister Sikua's address to the 63rd session of the United Nations General Assembly, 26 September 2008

1958 births
Living people
Members of the National Parliament of the Solomon Islands
People from Guadalcanal Province
Prime Ministers of the Solomon Islands
Leaders of the Opposition (Solomon Islands)
Solomon Islands Liberal Party politicians
University of Waikato alumni
Education ministers of the Solomon Islands